Graham Cripsey (born 8 December 1954) is a former professional snooker player and Wall of death rider. He turned pro as a snooker player aged 27 and was active as a professional From 1982 to 1996.

Early life
Cripsey came from a family of showmen who have been running a ‘Wall of death’ since the 1920s in their hometown of Skegness. It is a circular wall for motorcycle tricks. At age 12, he became a rider, which cost him a thumb in a riding accident.

Snooker career
Cripsey was the first player to be coached by Derek Hill - known as Big Del. Hill discovered Ronnie O'Sullivan in the early 1990s and coached many top players, such as Graeme Dott.

Cripsey began at the professional tournaments in the 1982–83 season and reached the 1983 World Snooker Championship following a win over Dennis Hughes. In 1984-85 he reached the second round at the International Open and the UK Championship. He was then ranked 89th in the world rankings. In the 1985–86 season he twice reached the last 32, in the Classic and in the UK Championship, beating Cliff Wilson and John Spencer, two players from the top 24 in the world rankings. In 1987, Bill Werbeniuk was defeated at the British Open in the last 32. By this point his ranking had risen to 48. In 1987-88 the Englishman achieved his biggest ranking success: He reached another round of 32 at the British Open. Although maintaining a 46th ranking, victories over Barry West and Eugene Hughes showed that he could compete with top players. 1988-89 started badly but at The Classic he stood out again, beating Steve Longworth, put him again in the last 32.

Cripsey was no longer in the top 64 world rankings by 1990. In a tournament with a special format, the snooker shoot-out in which a single frame was played he achieved his best professional result. He reached the quarter-finals and lost 62:66 against Alan McManus. He also slipped out of the top 100. In 1991 the professional tour was opened for everyone. Although he was able to remain professional, he had to play preliminary rounds, before the last 128. Overall he won only 4 games that year. At the Asian Open he played against Sean Storey. Although his opponent conceded 13 consecutive, Cripsey lost the frame 92–93. With 185 points scored in a frame, they set a new record. Cripsey lost the match 1–5.

The following year, Cripsey managed only one victory in a minor-ranking tournament, and fell from the top 128. In 1993/94 he had to play more pre-qualifying rounds. He did not reach the last 128. The following year he played only two tournaments and in 1995-96 only the pre-qualification of the World Snooker Championship. After that, he gave up the professional tournaments at age 41.

Later career
By the mid-90s he had returned to the family business. In 2004 he gave up the steep wall for reasons of age and lack of successors.

References

1954 births
Living people
English snooker players
English businesspeople
Sportspeople from Lincolnshire
People from Skegness